Popperaneus is a small genus of South American orb-weaver spiders first described by J. Cabra-García and Gustavo Hormiga in 2020.  it contains only two species, both transferred from Wagneria: P. gavensis and P. iguape.

See also
 List of Araneidae species: N–Z

References

Further reading

Araneidae genera
Spiders of South America